Tando Yuji Velaphi (born 17 April 1987) is an Australian professional football player who plays as a goalkeeper for Kochi United.

Club career

Early playing career
Velaphi trained at the AIS in Canberra on a football scholarship.

Perth SC (2006–2007)
Velaphi began his senior career at Perth SC and while there, had loan stints at Newcastle Jets and Queensland Roar.

Loan to Queensland Roar
Velaphi made his A-League debut with Queensland Roar on 12 January 2007 in a 2–1 win over Melbourne Victory at Docklands Stadium, his performance in the match earning praise from then-Queensland coach Frank Farina.

Perth Glory (2007–2011)
Velaphi was re-signed for Perth Glory as their youth marquee player, keeping him at the club until the end of the 2010–11 season. The 2009–10 season was Velaphi's best, solidifying his spot between the posts and keeping 9 clean sheets over the course of the campaign.

Melbourne Victory (2011–2013)
On 8 February 2011, Melbourne Victory announced that they had signed Velaphi on a two-year deal from Perth Glory on a free transfer. He made his début for the Victory in the 2011 AFC Champions League on 5 April, in a 1–1 draw against Tianjin Teda. He managed to play 4 out of the Victory's 6 Asian Champions League games. Unfortunately for Tando, he suffered an injury in the pre-season, just after the AFC Champions League, causing him to sit out for the vast majority of the season. He made his official A-League debut for the Victory in Round 26, the penultimate round of the season against the Wellington Phoenix at AAMI Park, a match in which the Victory won 3–0. He appeared in the following round against Perth Glory at Nib Stadium, but the Victory slumped to a 4–2 defeat.

Velaphi made his first appearance of the 2012–13 A-League season in the Victory's Round 3 match against Adelaide United, a match which the Victory won 2–1. He was then replaced in the starting lineup by Nathan Coe, and failed to make another appearance in the season.

Velaphi, along with teammates Diogo Ferreira, Spase Dilevski and Sam Gallagher, was released by Melbourne Victory in April 2013, shortly after the end of the 2012–13 A-League season. In his three years at the club, Velaphi made just 3 out of a possible 56 appearances for the club.

Melbourne Heart / City (2013–2016)
Following his release from the Victory, he joined cross town rivals Melbourne Heart on a one-year deal. He managed to play the last three matches of the 2013/14 season. Velaphi has also signed on for another 1-year deal with the Melbourne Heart after much discussion.

After a successful 2014/15 season where he became Melbourne City's first-choice goalkeeper, Velaphi signed a new contract keeping him at City until the end of the 2016/17 A-League season.

He was released during the January transfer window of the 2015–16 A-League season to pursue opportunity overseas.

Wellington Phoenix (2018)
After limited appearances at Shonan Bellmare, Velaphi returned to the A-League, signing a deal with Wellington Phoenix until the end of the 2017-2018 season. On his debut he saved a penalty from Diego Castro.

Return to Perth Glory (2018–2021)
In July 2018, Velaphi re-joined Perth Glory on a one-year contract, expected to create competition with Liam Reddy and Nick Feely for the number one goalkeeper position. Velaphi was released from the Glory at the end of the 2019–20 A-League.

Two months later he returned to Perth having signed a 1 year contract on 10 November 2020, the same day the side released Daniel Margush to move to the Western Sydney Wanderers FC.

Return to Japan and Joined to Kochi United SC (2022–) 

After spending three years at Perth, he confirmed his departure from Australian football on 11 February 2022, as he was officially announced as a new signing of Kochi United SC. It marked his return to Japan after six years spent playing overseas.

International career
Velaphi played for the Young Socceroos, playing in the 2006 AFC Youth Championship and is currently a member of the Olyroos. Due to the withdrawal of first-choice Olyroos goalkeeper Danny Vukovic through suspension, Velaphi was competing with Reading back-up keeper, Adam Federici to become the Olyroos' starting goalkeeper at the Beijing Olympics, but made no appearances for the Olyroos.

Tando revealed in January 2010 that his long-term ambition was to leave Australia and play regular football in Europe, in the hopes of securing a place on Australia's 2014 World Cup roster.

Personal life
Velaphi was born in Perth, Western Australia. His mother is Japanese and his father is Zimbabwean. Velaphi is currently studying in Bachelor of Business (Sport Management)	at Deakin University.

A-League career statistics

CS = Clean Sheets

1 - AFC Champions League statistics are included in season ending during group stages (i.e. ACL 2011 and A-League season 2010–11 etc.)

Japan career statistics

.

Honours
Shonan Bellmare
 J2 League: 2017

Perth Glory
 A-League: Premiers 2018–19

References

External links
 

1987 births
Living people
Australian soccer players
Australian people of Japanese descent
Australian people of Zimbabwean descent
Association football goalkeepers
Soccer players from Perth, Western Australia
Australian Institute of Sport soccer players
Perth Glory FC players
Brisbane Roar FC players
Melbourne City FC players
Shonan Bellmare players
Wellington Phoenix FC players
Kochi United SC players
A-League Men players
J1 League players
Japan Football League players
Australian expatriate soccer players
Expatriate footballers in Japan
Olympic soccer players of Australia
Footballers at the 2008 Summer Olympics
People educated at Shenton College